Valdez Sporting Club was an Ecuadorian football club based in Milagro, Guayas. The club was founded in 1991 after Filanbanco ceded its franchise to the club. That same year, it finished as the Serie A runner-up. The following year, they participated in their first and only Copa Libertadores. They successfully advanced out of the group stage and were eventually eliminated in the Round of 16 by San Lorenzo de Almagro by penalties. After six years, the club folded in 1997.

Achievements
Serie A
Runner-up (1): 1991

Performance in CONMEBOL competitions
Copa Libertadores: 1 participation
Best: 1992 (Round of 16)

References

Defunct football clubs in Ecuador
Association football clubs established in 1991
Association football clubs disestablished in 1997
1991 establishments in Ecuador
1997 disestablishments in Ecuador